Ratchet & Clank: Going Mobile is a platform shooter mobile game developed by Sony Pictures Mobile, released on 2 November 2005 in North America.

Synopsis
Ratchet and Clank are transported into a cell phone via the "MCGuFIN" and have to fight their way back out.

Plot
After some Bio Matter Converter technology is accidentally activated, Ratchet and Clank are transported inside a Secret Agent Clank vid-comic. Fighting off Megacorp security forces, including chickenbots, security bots, and security tanks, they manage to find a teleporter which takes them to the Communication Station, where transmissions can be sent out from the digital world and received from the analog one. They contact Big Al for help, and he tells them of the Macro Corporeal Geo Fragmentation Ion Negator (MCGuFIN), which could transport them back to the analog world. He says he possesses one (previously used as a door stop) and he will plug it into his copy of the Secret Agent Clank vid-comic for them to retrieve.

There is a problem, however, and the MCGuFIN is split into six pieces, each winding up inside a different vid-comic. After travelling between the vid-comics and retrieving them all, Ratchet and Clank return to Al, who informs them that they need the Infolink located in Maximillian's (Secret Agent Clank's nemesis, seen in the beginning of Up your Arsenal) office. After bribing his bouncer they discover that Maximillian has already left. He has apparently used the Infolink to escape to the analog world, where he plans to wreak havoc. They go to confront him and he reveals that it was all a trap to try to take the MCGuFIN. They defeat him and his security cannon, activate the MCGuFIN by sliding down the appropriate Infolink, and prepare to transport themselves back to an unknown place in the analog world.

This left an opening for an eventually-cancelled sequel, which would have been called Ratchet & Clank: Clone Home.

Gameplay
Players can collect titanium bolts, upgrade weapons (to level 3), and defeat enemies. An upgrade meter for weapons is not displayed, however the HUD consists of (from left to right) an ammo meter, nanotech and bolt counter. Going Mobile allows for up to three save slots. The game is almost entirely devoid of sound except the main menu, and there are four different enemies. There is also an Arena where the duo can participate in 12 challenges. They are (in order):
 Micro Alley
 Cratescraper Coliseum
 Lance-a-Palooza 1
 Explodo Zone
Wrench Rumble
 Lance-a-Palooza 2
 Timed to Die
 Assassination Station
 Missile Maelstrom
 Assassination Station Continuation
 Timed to Die Again
 Boar Blitz Battle

There are 7 weapons: The Lancer, Gravity Bomb, Mini Rocket, Defragmenter, Circuit Jammer (given by Big Al) and the Boar-Zooka (obtained after completion of the Arena) and the OmniWrench.

Reception 

IGN, who played the game on an LG VX8000 and a Nokia 6620, praised the graphics, the unique weapons, and the platforming, seeing the experience as reminiscent of gaming in the late 80s and mid-90s. They called Going Mobile an "excellent blueprint for how to make the jump" from a console game to a mobile game, giving it an 8.6/10 and concluding: "Definitely download this one."

Pocket Gamer echoed this sentiment, saying that the source material from the main series survived the jump from 3D to 2D, just "on a much smaller scale," and remarking: "after about ten minutes, you actually forget that you're playing a 2D mobile game". They called the shooting and platforming gameplay "fairly typical" but praised the game design, graphics, controls, weapons, and amount of content, calling it "great value for your money" and giving it a 4/5.

GameSpot praised the game's visuals and "sharp gameplay", but criticized the repetition, stating: "The second half of the game has you revisiting previous stages." They additionally criticized the game's length of an "hour or two of gameplay" as well as its "fairly barren" sound design, giving the game a 6.6/10.

In a 2012 review, Jeuxvideo.com was substantially harsher than contemporary reviewers, saying the game's "quality is nothing like current mobile productions, either in terms of production or gameplay" and calling it "too basic", "a game developed to exploit the vein of licensing" and "neither excellent nor totally failed."

Awards
Best Action Game at the Third Annual Mobile Entertainment Awards

Cancelled sequel
A sequel was planned in 2006, to be called Ratchet & Clank: Clone Home, but it was cancelled. The scope would have been similar to Size Matters and would have had Ratchet and Clank minimizing themselves to fight some "imitators they do not find flattering". It was also claimed that Clone Home would offer more weapons than Going Mobile, and six screenshots were supplied from the game. It would also have included 15 levels.

References

External links 
 
 

2005 video games
Mobile games
Ratchet & Clank
Sony mobile games
Video games developed in the United States